Israeli settlements, also known as "colonies", are civilian communities where Israeli citizens live, almost exclusively of Jewish ethnicity, built on lands occupied by Israel in the 1967 Six-Day War. The international community consider Israeli settlements to be illegal under international law, though Israel disputes this.

Israeli settlements currently exist in the West Bank (including East Jerusalem), claimed by the State of Palestine as its sovereign territory, and in the Golan Heights, which is internationally considered Syrian territory. East Jerusalem and the Golan Heights have been effectively annexed by Israel, though the international community has rejected any change of status in both territories and continues to consider each occupied territory. Although the West Bank settlements are on land administered under Israeli military rule rather than civil law, Israeli civil law is "pipelined" into the settlements, such that Israeli citizens living there are treated similarly to those living in Israel.

As of January 2023, there are 144 Israeli settlements in the West Bank, including 12 in East Jerusalem. In addition, there are over 100 Israeli illegal outposts in the West Bank. In total, over 450,000 Israeli settlers live in the West Bank excluding East Jerusalem, with an additional 220,000 Jewish settlers residing in East Jerusalem. Additionally, over 25,000 Israeli settlers live in the Golan Heights.

Israeli settlements had previously been built within the Egyptian territory of the Sinai Peninsula, and within the Palestinian territory of the Gaza Strip; however, Israel evacuated and dismantled the 18 Sinai settlements following the 1979 Egypt–Israel peace agreement and all of the 21 settlements in the Gaza Strip, along with four in the West Bank, in 2005 as part of its unilateral disengagement from Gaza.

Israel has established Jewish neighborhoods in East Jerusalem and in the Israeli-occupied portion of the Golan Heights, both of which Israel has effectively annexed, and as such Israel does not consider the developments there to be settlements. The international community regards both territories as held under Israeli occupation and the localities established there to be illegal settlements. The International Court of Justice found the settlements to be illegal in its 2004 advisory opinion on the West Bank barrier. In the West Bank, Israel continues to expand its remaining settlements as well as settling new areas, despite pressure from the international community to desist.

The transfer by an occupying power of its civilian population into the territory it occupies is a war crime, although Israel disputes that this applies to the West Bank. On 20 December 2019, the International Criminal Court announced an International Criminal Court investigation in Palestine into alleged war crimes. The presence and ongoing expansion of existing settlements by Israel and the construction of settlement outposts is frequently criticized as an obstacle to the Israeli–Palestinian peace process by the Palestinians, and third parties such as the OIC, the United Nations, Russia, the United Kingdom, France, and the European Union have echoed those criticisms. The international community considers the settlements to be illegal under international law, and the United Nations has repeatedly upheld the view that Israel's construction of settlements constitutes a violation of the Fourth Geneva Convention. The United States for decades considered the settlements to be "illegitimate", until the Trump Administration in November 2019 shifted its position, declaring "the establishment of Israeli civilian settlements in the West Bank is not per se inconsistent with international law."

Housing costs and state subventions 
Settlement has an economic dimension, much of it driven by the significantly lower costs of housing for Israeli citizens living in Israeli settlements compared to the cost of housing and living in Israel proper. Government spending per citizen in the settlements is double that spent per Israeli citizen in Tel Aviv and Jerusalem, while government spending for settlers in isolated Israeli settlements is three times the Israeli national average. Most of the spending goes to the security of the Israeli citizens living there.

Number of settlements and inhabitants 

As of January 2023, there are 144 Israeli settlements in the West Bank, including 12 in East Jerusalem. In addition, there are over 100 Israeli illegal outposts in the West Bank. In total, over 450,000 Israeli settlers live in the West Bank excluding East Jerusalem, with an additional 220,000 Jewish settlers residing in East Jerusalem.

Additionally, over 20,000 Israeli citizens live in settlements in the Golan Heights.

Character: rural and urban 
Settlements range in character from farming communities and frontier villages to urban suburbs and neighborhoods. The four largest settlements, Modi'in Illit, Ma'ale Adumim, Beitar Illit and Ariel, have achieved city status. Ariel has 18,000 residents, while the rest have around 37,000 to 55,500 each.

History

Occupied territories 
Following the 1967 Six-Day War, Israel occupied a number of territories. It took over the remainder of the Palestinian Mandate territories of the West Bank including East Jerusalem, from Jordan which had controlled the territories since the 1948 Arab-Israeli war, and the Gaza Strip from Egypt, which had held Gaza under occupation since 1949. From Egypt, it also captured the Sinai Peninsula and from Syria it captured most of the Golan Heights, which since 1981 has been administered under the Golan Heights Law.

Settlement policy 
As early as September 1967, Israeli settlement policy was progressively encouraged by the Labor government of Levi Eshkol. The basis for Israeli settlement in the West Bank became the Allon Plan, named after its inventor Yigal Allon. It implied Israeli annexation of major parts of the Israeli-occupied territories, especially East Jerusalem, Gush Etzion and the Jordan Valley. The settlement policy of the government of Yitzhak Rabin was also derived from the Allon Plan.

The first settlement was Kfar Etzion, in the southern West Bank, although that location was outside the Allon Plan. Many settlements began as Nahal settlements. They were established as military outposts and later expanded and populated with civilian inhabitants. According to a secret document dating to 1970, obtained by Haaretz, the settlement of Kiryat Arba was established by confiscating land by military order and falsely representing the project as being strictly for military use while in reality, Kiryat Arba was planned for settler use. The method of confiscating land by military order for establishing civilian settlements was an open secret in Israel throughout the 1970s, but publication of the information was suppressed by the military censor.

The Likud government of Menahem Begin, from 1977, was more supportive to settlement in other parts of the West Bank, by organizations like Gush Emunim and the Jewish Agency/World Zionist Organization, and intensified the settlement activities. In a government statement, Likud declared that the entire historic Land of Israel is the inalienable heritage of the Jewish people and that no part of the West Bank should be handed over to foreign rule. Ariel Sharon declared in the same year (1977) that there was a plan to settle 2 million Jews in the West Bank by 2000. The government abrogated the prohibition from purchasing occupied land by Israelis; the "Drobles Plan", a plan for large-scale settlement in the West Bank meant to prevent a Palestinian state under the pretext of security became the framework for its policy. The "Drobles Plan" from the World Zionist Organization, dated October 1978 and named "Master Plan for the Development of Settlements in Judea and Samaria, 1979–1983", was written by the Jewish Agency director and former Knesset member Matityahu Drobles. In January 1981, the government adopted a follow up-plan from Drobles, dated September 1980 and named "The current state of the settlements in Judea and Samaria", with more details about settlement strategy and policy.

Since 1967, government-funded settlement projects in the West Bank are implemented by the "Settlement Division" of the World Zionist Organization. Though formally a non-governmental organization, it is funded by the Israeli government and leases lands from the Civil Administration to settle in the West Bank. It is authorized to create settlements in the West Bank on lands licensed to it by the Civil Administration. Traditionally, the Settlement Division has been under the responsibility of the Agriculture Ministry. Since the Oslo Accords, it was always housed within the Prime Minister's Office (PMO). In 2007, it was moved back to the Agriculture Ministry. In 2009, the Netanyahu Government decided to subject all settlement activities to additional approval of the Prime Minister and the Defense Minister. In 2011, Netanyahu sought to move the Settlement Division again under the direct control of (his own) PMO, and to curtail Defense Minister Ehud Barak's authority.

At the presentation of the Oslo II Accord on 5 October 1995 in the Knesset, PM Yitzhak Rabin expounded the Israeli settlement policy in connection with the permanent solution to the conflict. Israel wanted "a Palestinian entity, less than a state, which will be a home to most of the Palestinian residents living in the Gaza Strip and the West Bank". It wanted to keep settlements beyond the Green Line including Ma'ale Adumim and Givat Ze'ev in East Jerusalem. Blocs of settlements should be established in the West Bank. Rabin promised not to return to the 4 June 1967 lines.

In June 1997, the Likud government of Benjamin Netanyahu presented its "Allon Plus Plan". This plan holds the retention of some 60% of the West Bank, including the "Greater Jerusalem" area with the settlements Gush Etzion and Ma'aleh Adumim, other large concentrations of settlements in the West Bank, the entire Jordan Valley, a "security area", and a network of Israeli-only bypass roads.

In the Road map for peace of 2002, which was never implemented, the establishment of a Palestinian state was acknowledged. Outposts would be dismantled. However, many new outposts appeared instead, few were removed. Israel's settlement policy remained unchanged. Settlements in East Jerusalem and remaining West Bank were expanded.

While according to official Israeli policy no new settlements were built, at least some hundred unauthorized outposts were established since 2002 with state funding in the 60% of the West Bank that was not under Palestinian administrative control and the population growth of settlers did not diminish.

In 2005, all 21 settlements in the Gaza Strip and four in the northern West Bank were forcibly evacuated as part of Israeli disengagement from the Gaza Strip, known to some in Israel as "the Expulsion". However, the disengagement was more than compensated by transfers to the West Bank.

After the failure of the Roadmap, several new plans emerged to settle in major parts of the West Bank. In 2011, Haaretz revealed the Civil Administration's "Blue Line"-plan, written in January 2011, which aims to increase Israeli "state-ownership" of West Bank land ("state lands") and settlement in strategic areas like the Jordan Valley and the northern Dead Sea area. In March 2012, it was revealed that the Civil Administration over the years covertly allotted 10% of the West Bank for further settlement. Provisional names for future new settlements or settlement expansions were already assigned. The plan includes many Palestinian built-up sites in the Areas A and B.

Geography and municipal status 

Some settlements are self-contained cities with a stable population in the tens of thousands, infrastructure, and all other features of permanence. Examples are Beitar Illit (a city of close to 45,000 residents), Ma'ale Adumim, Modi'in Illit, and Ariel (almost 20,000 residents). Some are towns with a local council status with populations of 2,000–20,0000, such as Alfei Menashe, Eli, Elkana, Efrat and Kiryat Arba. There are also clusters of villages governed by a local elected committee and regional councils that are responsible for municipal services. Examples are Kfar Adumim, Neve Daniel, Kfar Tapuach and Ateret. Kibbutzim and moshavim in the territories include Argaman, Gilgal, Niran and Yitav. Jewish neighborhoods have been built on the outskirts of Arab neighborhoods, for example in Hebron. In Jerusalem, there are urban neighborhoods where Jews and Arabs live together: the Muslim Quarter, Silwan, Abu Tor, Sheikh Jarrah and Shimon HaTzadik.

Under the Oslo Accords, the West Bank was divided into three separate parts designated as Area A, Area B and Area C. Leaving aside the position of East Jerusalem, all of the settlements are in Area C which comprises about 60% of the West Bank.

Types of settlement 
 Cities/towns: Ariel, Betar Illit, Modi'in Illit and Ma'ale Adumim.
 Urban suburbs, such as Har Gilo.
 Block settlements, such as Gush Etzion and settlements in the Nablus area.
 Frontier villages, such as those along the Jordan River.
 Outposts, small settlements, some authorized and some unauthorized, often on hilltops. The Sasson Report, commissioned by Ariel Sharon's administration, found that several government ministries had cooperated to establish illegal outposts, spending millions of dollars on infrastructure.

Resettlement of former Jewish communities 
Some settlements were established on sites where Jewish communities had existed during the British Mandate of Palestine or even since the First Aliyah or ancient times.
 Golan Heights – Bnei Yehuda, founded in 1890, abandoned because of Arab attacks in 1920, rebuilt near the original site in 1972.
 Jerusalem – Jewish presence alongside other peoples since biblical times, various surrounding communities and neighborhoods, including Kfar Shiloah, also known as Silwan—settled by Yemenite Jews in 1884, Jewish residents evacuated in 1938, a few Jewish families move into reclaimed homes in 2004. Other communities: Shimon HaTzadik, Neve Yaakov and Atarot which in post-1967 was rebuilt as an industrial zone.
 Gush Etzion – four communities, established between 1927 and 1947, destroyed 1948, reestablished beginning 1967.
 Hebron – Jewish presence since biblical times, forced out in the wake of the 1929 Hebron massacre, some families returned in 1931 but were evacuated by the British, a few buildings resettled since 1967.
 Dead Sea, northern area – Kalia and Beit HaArava – the former was built in 1934 as a kibbutz for potash mining. The latter was built in 1943 as an agricultural community. Both were abandoned in 1948, and subsequently destroyed by Jordanian forces, and resettled after the Six-Day War.
 Gaza City had a Jewish community for many centuries that was evacuated following riots in 1929. After the Six-Day War, Jewish communities weren't built in Gaza City, but in Gush Katif in the southwestern part of the Gaza Strip, f.e. Kfar Darom – established in 1946, evacuated in 1948 after an Egyptian attack, resettled in 1970, evacuated in 2005 as part of the withdrawal from the Gaza Strip.

Demographics 

At the end of 2010, 534,224 Jewish Israeli lived in the West Bank, including East Jerusalem. 314,132 of them lived in the 121 authorised settlements and 102 unauthorised settlement outposts on the West Bank, 198,629 were living in East Jerusalem, and almost 20,000 lived in settlements in the Golan Heights.

By 2011, the number of Jewish settlers in the West Bank excluding East Jerusalem had increased to 328,423 people.

In June 2014, the number of Israeli settlers in the West Bank excluding East Jerusalem had increased to 382,031 people, with over 20,000 Israeli settlers in the Golan Heights.

In January 2015, the Israeli Interior Ministry gave figures of 389,250 Israeli citizens living in the West Bank outside East Jerusalem.

By the end of 2016, the West Bank Jewish population had risen to 420,899, excluding East Jerusalem, where there were more than 200,000 Jews.

In 2019, the number of Israeli settlers in the West Bank excluding East Jerusalem had risen to 441,600 individuals, and the number of Israeli settlers in the Golan Heights had risen to 25,261.

In 2020, the number of Israeli settlers in the West Bank excluding East Jerusalem had reportedly risen to 451,700 individuals, with an additional 220,000 Jews living in East Jerusalem.

Based on various sources, population dispersal can be estimated as follows:

 1 including Sinai
 2 Janet Abu-Lughod mentions 500 settlers in Gaza in 1978 (excluding Sinai), and 1,000 in 1980

In addition to internal migration, in large though declining numbers, the settlements absorb annually about 1000 new immigrants from outside Israel. The American Kulanu organization works with such right-wing Israeli settler groups as Amishav and Shavei Israel to settle "lost" Jews of color in such areas where local Palestinians are being displaced.  In the 1990s, the annual settler population growth was more than three times the annual population growth in Israel. Population growth has continued in the 2000s. According to the BBC, the settlements in the West Bank have been growing at a rate of 5–6% since 2001. In 2016, there were sixty thousand American Israelis living in settlements in the West Bank.

The establishment of settlements in the Palestinian territories is linked to the displacement of the Palestinian populations as evidenced by a 1979 Security Council Commission which established a link between Israeli settlements and the displacement of the local population. The commission also found that those who remained were under consistent pressure to leave to make room for further settlers who were being encouraged into the area. In conclusion the commission stated that settlement in the Palestinian territories was causing "profound and irreversible changes of a geographic and demographic nature".

Administration and local government

West Bank 

The Israeli settlements in the West Bank fall under the administrative district of Judea and Samaria Area. Since December 2007, approval by both the Israeli Prime Minister and Israeli Defense Minister of all settlement activities (including planning) in the West Bank is required. Authority for planning and construction is held by the Israel Defense Forces Civil Administration.

The area consists of four cities, thirteen local councils and six regional councils.
Cities: Ariel, Betar Illit, Maale Adumim, Modi'in Illit;
Local councils: Alfei Menashe, Beit Aryeh-Ofarim, Beit El, Efrat, Elkana, Giv'at Ze'ev, Har Adar, Immanuel, Karnei Shomron, Kedumim, Kiryat Arba, Ma'ale Efraim, Oranit;
Regional councils: Gush Etzion (Ezion Bloc), Har Hebron (Mount Hebron), Matte Binyamin (Staff of Benjamin, named after the ancient Israelite tribe that dwelled in the area), Megilot (Scrolls, named after the Dead Sea scrolls, which were discovered in the area), Shomron Regional Council (Samaria), Biq'at HaYarden (Jordan valley).
The Yesha Council (Moatzat Yesha, a Hebrew acronym for Judea, Samaria and Gaza) is the umbrella organization of municipal councils in the West Bank.

The actual buildings of the Israeli settlements cover only 1 percent of the West Bank, but their jurisdiction and their regional councils extend to about 42 percent of the West Bank, according to the Israeli NGO B'Tselem. Yesha Council chairman Dani Dayan disputes the figures and claims that the settlements only control 9.2 percent of the West Bank.

Between 2001 and 2007 more than 10,000 Israeli settlement units were built, while 91 permits were issued for Palestinian construction, and 1,663 Palestinian structures were demolished in Area C.

West Bank Palestinians have their cases tried in Israel's military courts while Jewish Israeli settlers living in the same occupied territory are tried in civil courts. The arrangement has been described as "de facto segregation" by the UN Committee on the Elimination of Racial Discrimination.
A bill to formally extend Israeli law to the Israeli settlements in the West Bank was rejected in 2012. The basic military laws governing the West Bank are influenced by what is called the "pipelining" of Israeli legislation. As a result of "enclave law", large portions of Israeli civil law are applied to Israeli settlements and Israeli residents in the occupied territories.

On 31 August 2014, Israel announced it was appropriating 400 hectares of land in the West Bank to eventually house 1,000 Israel families. The appropriation was described as the largest in more than 30 years. According to reports on Israel Radio, the development is a response to the 2014 kidnapping and murder of Israeli teenagers.

East Jerusalem 
East Jerusalem is defined in the Jerusalem Law as part of Israel and its capital, Jerusalem. As such it is administered as part of the city and its district, the Jerusalem District. Pre-1967 residents of East Jerusalem and their descendants have residency status in the city but many have refused Israeli citizenship. Thus, the Israeli government maintains an administrative distinction between Israeli citizens and non-citizens in East Jerusalem, but the Jerusalem municipality does not.

Golan Heights 
The Golan Heights is administered under Israeli civil law as the Golan sub-district, a part of the Northern District. Israel makes no legal or administrative distinction between pre-1967 communities in the Golan Heights (mainly Druze) and the post-1967 settlements.

Sinai Peninsula 

After the capture of the Sinai Peninsula from Egypt in the 1967 Six-Day War, settlements were established along the Gulf of Aqaba and in northeast Sinai, just below the Gaza Strip. Israel had plans to expand the settlement of Yamit into a city with a population of 200,000, though the actual population of Yamit did not exceed 3,000. The Sinai Peninsula was returned to Egypt in stages beginning in 1979 as part of the Egypt–Israel peace treaty. As required by the treaty, in 1982 Israel evacuated the Israeli civilian population from the 18 Sinai settlements in Sinai. In some instances evacuations were done forcefully, such as the evacuation of Yamit. All the settlements were then dismantled.

Gaza Strip 

Before Israel's unilateral disengagement plan in which the Israeli settlements were evacuated, there were 21 settlements in the Gaza Strip under the administration of the Hof Aza Regional Council. The land was allocated in such a way that each Israeli settler disposed of 400 times the land available to the Palestinian refugees, and 20 times the volume of water allowed to the peasant farmers of the Strip.

Legal status 

The consensus view in the international community is that the existence of Israeli settlements in the West Bank including East Jerusalem and the Golan Heights is in violation of international law. The Fourth Geneva Convention includes statements such as "the Occupying Power shall not deport or transfer parts of its own civilian population into the territory it occupies". On 20 December 2019, International Criminal Court chief prosecutor Fatou Bensouda announced an International Criminal Court investigation in Palestine into alleged war crimes committed during the Israeli–Palestinian conflict. At present, the view of the international community, as reflected in numerous UN resolutions, regards the building and existence of Israeli settlements in the West Bank, East Jerusalem and the Golan Heights as a violation of international law. UN Security Council Resolution 446 refers to the Fourth Geneva Convention as the applicable international legal instrument, and calls upon Israel to desist from transferring its own population into the territories or changing their demographic makeup. The reconvened Conference of the High Contracting Parties to the Geneva Conventions has declared the settlements illegal as has the primary judicial organ of the UN, the International Court of Justice.

The position of successive Israeli governments is that all authorized settlements are entirely legal and consistent with international law. In practice, Israel does not accept that the Fourth Geneva Convention applies de jure, but has stated that on humanitarian issues it will govern itself de facto by its provisions, without specifying which these are. The scholar and jurist Eugene Rostow has disputed the illegality of authorized settlements.

Under Israeli law, West Bank settlements must meet specific criteria to be legal. In 2009, there were approximately 100 small communities that did not meet these criteria and are referred to as illegal outposts.

In 2014 twelve EU countries warned businesses against involving themselves in the settlements. According to the warnings, economic activities relating to the settlements involve legal and economic risks stemming from the fact that the settlements are built on occupied land not recognized as Israel's.

Illegality arguments 
The consensus of the international community – the vast majority of states, the overwhelming majority of legal experts, the International Court of Justice and the UN, is that settlements are in violation of international law.
After the Six-Day War, in 1967, Theodor Meron, legal counsel to the Israeli Foreign Ministry stated in a legal opinion to the Prime Minister,

"My conclusion is that civilian settlement in the administered territories contravenes the explicit provisions of the Fourth Geneva Convention."

This legal opinion was sent to Prime Minister Levi Eshkol. However, it was not made public at the time. The Labor cabinet allowed settlements despite the warning. This paved the way for future settlement growth. In 2007, Meron stated that "I believe that I would have given the same opinion today."

In 1978, the Legal Adviser of the Department of State of the United States reached the same conclusion.

The International Court of Justice, in its advisory opinion, has since ruled that Israel is in breach of international law by establishing settlements in Occupied Palestinian Territory, including East Jerusalem. The Court maintains that Israel cannot rely on its right of self-defense or necessity to impose a regime that violates international law. The Court also ruled that Israel violates basic human rights by impeding liberty of movement and the inhabitants' right to work, health, education and an adequate standard of living.

International intergovernmental organizations such as the Conference of the High Contracting Parties to the Fourth Geneva Convention, major organs of the United Nations, the European Union, and Canada, also regard the settlements as a violation of international law. The Committee on the Elimination of Racial Discrimination wrote that "The status of the settlements was clearly inconsistent with Article 3 of the Convention, which, as noted in the Committee's General Recommendation XIX, prohibited all forms of racial segregation in all countries. There is a consensus among publicists that the prohibition of racial discrimination, irrespective of territories, is an imperative norm of international law." Amnesty International, and Human Rights Watch have also characterized the settlements as a violation of international law.

In late January 2013 a report drafted by three justices, presided over by Christine Chanet, and issued by the United Nations Human Rights Council declared that Jewish settlements constituted a creeping annexation based on multiple violations of the Geneva Conventions and international law, and stated that if Palestine ratified the Rome Accord, Israel could be tried for "gross violations of human rights law and serious violations of international humanitarian law." A spokesman for Israel's Foreign Ministry declared the report 'unfortunate' and accused the UN's Human Rights Council of a "systematically one-sided and biased approach towards Israel."

According to Talia Sasson, the High Court of Justice in Israel, with a variety of different justices sitting, has repeatedly stated for more than 4 decades that Israel's presence in the West Bank is in violation of international law.

Legality arguments 
Four prominent jurists cited the concept of the "sovereignty vacuum" in the immediate aftermath of the Six-Day War to describe the legal status of the West Bank and Gaza: Yehuda Zvi Blum in 1968, Elihu Lauterpacht in 1968, Julius Stone in 1969 and 1981, and Stephen M. Schwebel in 1970. Eugene V. Rostow also argued in 1979 that the occupied territories' legal status was undetermined.
Stephen M. Schwebel made three distinctions specific to the Israeli situation to claim that the territories were seized in self-defense and that Israel has more title to them than the previous holders.
Professor Julius Stone also wrote that "Israel's presence in all these areas pending negotiation of new borders is entirely lawful, since Israel entered them lawfully in self-defense." He argued that it would be an "irony bordering on the absurd" to read Article 49(6) as meaning that the State of Israel was obliged to ensure (by force if necessary) that areas with a millennial association with Jewish life, shall be forever "judenrein".
Professor Ben Saul took exception to this view, arguing that Article 49(6) can be read to include voluntary or assisted transfers, as indeed it was in the advisory opinion of the International Court of Justice which had expressed this interpretation in the Israeli Wall Advisory Opinion (2003).

Israel maintains that a temporary use of land and buildings for various purposes is permissible under a plea of military necessity and that the settlements fulfilled security needs. Israel argues that its settlement policy is consistent with international law, including the Fourth Geneva Convention, while recognising that some settlements have been constructed illegally on private land. The Israeli Supreme Court has ruled that the power of the Civil Administration and the Military Commander in the occupied territories is limited by the entrenched customary rules of public international law as codified in the Hague Regulations. In 1998 the Israeli Minister of Foreign Affairs produced "The International Criminal Court Background Paper". It concludesInternational law has long recognised that there are crimes of such severity they should be considered "international crimes." Such crimes have been established in treaties such as the Genocide Convention and the Geneva Conventions.... The following are Israel's primary issues of concern [ie with the rules of the ICC]: The inclusion of settlement activity as a "war crime" is a cynical attempt to abuse the Court for political ends. The implication that the transfer of civilian population to occupied territories can be classified as a crime equal in gravity to attacks on civilian population centres or mass murder is preposterous and has no basis in international law.

A UN conference was held in Rome in 1998, where Israel was one of seven countries to vote against the Rome Statute to establish the International Criminal Court. Israel was opposed to a provision that included as a war crime the transfer of civilian populations into territory the government occupies. Israel has signed the statute, but not ratified the treaty.

Land ownership 

A 1996 amendment to an Israeli military order, states that land privately owned can not be part of a settlement, unless the land in question has been confiscated for military purposes. In 2006 Peace Now acquired a report, which it claims was leaked from the Israeli Government's Civil Administration, indicating that up to 40 percent of the land Israel plans to retain in the West Bank is privately owned by Palestinians. Peace Now called this a violation of Israeli law. Peace Now published a comprehensive report about settlements on private lands. In the wake of a legal battle, Peace Now lowered the figure to 32 percent, which the Civil Administration also denied. The Washington Post reported that "The 38-page report offers what appears to be a comprehensive argument against the Israeli government's contention that it avoids building on private land, drawing on the state's own data to make the case."

In February 2008, the Civil Administration stated that the land on which more than a third of West Bank settlements was built had been expropriated by the IDF for "security purposes." The unauthorized seizure of private Palestinian land was defined by the Civil Administration itself as 'theft.' According to B'Tselem, more than 42 percent of the West Bank are under control of the Israeli settlements, 21 percent of which was seized from private Palestinian owners, much of it in violation of the 1979 Israeli Supreme Court decision.

In 1979, the government decided to extend settlements or build new ones only on "state lands".

A secret database, drafted by a retired senior officer, Baruch Spiegel, on orders from former defense minister Shaul Mofaz, found that some settlements deemed legal by Israel were illegal outposts, and that large portions of Ofra, Elon Moreh and Beit El were built on private Palestinian land. The "Spiegel report" was revealed by Haaretz in 2009. Many settlements are largely built on private lands, without approval of the Israeli Government. According to Israel, the bulk of the land was vacant, was leased from the state, or bought fairly from Palestinian landowners.

Invoking the Absentee Property Law to transfer, sell or lease property in East Jerusalem owned by Palestinians who live elsewhere without compensation has been criticized both inside and outside of Israel. Opponents of the settlements claim that "vacant" land belonged to Arabs who fled or collectively to an entire village, a practice that developed under Ottoman rule. B'Tselem charged that Israel is using the absence of modern legal documents for the communal land as a legal basis for expropriating it. These "abandoned lands" are sometimes laundered through a series of fraudulent sales.

According to Amira Hass, one of the techniques used by Israel to expropriate Palestinian land is to place desired areas under a 'military firing zone' classification, and then issue orders for the evacuation of Palestinians from the villages in that range, while allowing contiguous Jewish settlements to remain unaffected.

Effects on Palestinian human rights 

Amnesty International argues that Israel's settlement policy is discriminatory and a violation of Palestinian human rights. B'Tselem claims that Israeli travel restrictions impact on Palestinian freedom of movement and Palestinian human rights have been violated in Hebron due to the presence of the settlers within the city. According to B'Tselem, over fifty percent of West Bank land expropriated from Palestinians has been used to establish settlements and create reserves of land for their future expansion. The seized lands mainly benefit the settlements and Palestinians cannot use them. The roads built by Israel in the West Bank to serve the settlements are closed to Palestinian vehicles' and act as a barrier often between villages and the lands on which they subsist.

Human Rights Watch and other human rights observer volunteer regularly file reports on "settler violence," referring to stoning and shooting incidents involving Israeli settlers. Israel's withdrawal from Gaza and Hebron have led to violent settler protests and disputes over land and resources. Meron Benvenisti described the settlement enterprise as a "commercial real estate project that conscripts Zionist rhetoric for profit."

The construction of the Israeli West Bank barrier has been criticized as an infringement on Palestinian human and land rights. The United Nations Office for the Coordination of Humanitarian Affairs estimated that 10% of the West Bank would fall on the Israeli side of the barrier.

In July 2012, the UN Human Rights Council decided to set up a probe into Jewish settlements. The report of the independent international fact-finding mission which investigated the "implications of the Israeli settlements on the civil, political, economic, social and cultural rights of the Palestinian people throughout the Occupied Palestinian Territory" was published in February 2013.

In February 2020, the Office of the United Nations High Commissioner for Human Rights published a list of 112 companies linked to activities related to Israeli settlements in the occupied West Bank.

Economy 

Goods produced in Israeli settlements are able to stay competitive on the global market, in part because of massive state subsidies they receive from the Israeli government. Farmers and producers are given state assistance, while companies that set up in the territories receive tax breaks and direct government subsidies. An Israeli government fund has also been established to help companies pay customs penalties. Palestinian officials estimate that settlers sell goods worth some $500 million to the Palestinian market. Israel has built 16 industrial zones, containing roughly 1000 industrial plants, in the West Bank and East Jerusalem on acreage that consumes large parts of the territory planned for a future Palestinian state. According to Jodi Rudoren these installations both entrench the occupation and provide work for Palestinians, even those opposed to it. The 16 parks are located at Shaked, Beka'ot, Baran, Karnei Shomron, Emmanuel, Barkan, Ariel, Shilo, Halamish, Ma'ale Efraim, Sha'ar Binyamin, Atarot, Mishor Adumim, Gush Etzion, Kiryat Arba and Metarim (2001).

In spite of this, the West Bank settlements have failed to develop a self-sustaining local economy. About 60% of the settler workforce commutes to Israel for work. The settlements rely primarily on the labor of their residents in Israel proper rather than local manufacturing, agriculture, or research and development. Of the industrial parks in the settlements, there are only two significant ones, at Ma'ale Adumim and Barkan, with most of the workers there being Palestinian. Only a few hundred settler households cultivate agricultural land, and rely primarily on Palestinian labor in doing so.

Settlement has an economic dimension, much of it driven by the significantly lower costs of housing for Israeli citizens living in Israeli settlements compared to the cost of housing and living in Israel proper. Government spending per citizen in the settlements is double that spent per Israeli citizen in Tel Aviv and Jerusalem, while government spending for settlers in isolated Israeli settlements is three times the Israeli national average. Most of the spending goes to the security of the Israeli citizens living there.

Export to EU 
According to Israeli government estimates, $230 million worth of settler goods including fruit, vegetables, cosmetics, textiles and toys are exported to the EU each year, accounting for approximately 2% of all Israeli exports to Europe. A 2013 report of Profundo revealed that at least 38 Dutch companies imported settlement products.

European Union law requires a distinction to be made between goods originating in Israel and those from the occupied territories. The former benefit from preferential custom treatment according to the EU-Israel Association Agreement (2000); the latter don't, having been explicitly excluded from the agreement. In practice, however, settler goods often avoid mandatory customs through being labelled as originating in Israel, while European customs authorities commonly fail to complete obligatory postal code checks of products to ensure they have not originated in the occupied territories.

In 2009, the United Kingdom's Department for the Environment, Food and Rural Affairs issued new guidelines concerning labelling of goods imported from the West Bank. The new guidelines require labelling to clarify whether West Bank products originate from settlements or from the Palestinian economy. Israel's foreign ministry said that the UK was "catering to the demands of those whose ultimate goal is the boycott of Israeli products"; but this was denied by the UK government, who said that the aim of the new regulations was to allow consumers to choose for themselves what produce they buy. Denmark has similar legislation requiring food products from settlements in the occupied territories to be accurately labelled. In June 2022, Norway also stated that it would begin complying with EU regulation to label produce originating from Israeli settlements in the West Bank and Golan Heights as such.

On 12 November 2019 the Court of Justice of the European Union in a ruling covering all territory Israel captured in the 1967 war decided that labels on foodstuffs must not imply that goods produced in occupied territory came from Israel itself and must "prevent consumers from being misled as to the fact that the State of Israel is present in the territories concerned as an occupying power and not as a sovereign entity". In its ruling, the court said that failing to inform EU consumers they were potentially buying goods produced in settlements denies them access to "ethical considerations and considerations relating to the observance of international law".

In January 2019 the Dail (Ireland's lower house) voted in favour, by 78 to 45, of the Control of Economic Activity (Occupied Territories) bill. This piece of legislation prohibits the purchasing of any good and/or service from the Golan Heights, East Jerusalem or West Bank settlements. As of February 2019 the bill has some stages to be completed,once codified, either a five-year jail sentence or fines of up to €250,000 ($284,000) will affect anyone who breaks this law.

A petition under the European Citizens' Initiative, submitted in September 2021, was accepted on 20 February 2022. The petition seeks the adoption of legislation to ban trade with unlawful settlements. The petition requires a million signatures from across the EU and has received support from civil society groups including Human Rights Watch.

Palestinian economy and resources 
A Palestinian report argued in 2011 that settlements have a detrimental effect on the Palestinian economy, equivalent to about 85% of the nominal gross domestic product of Palestine, and that the "occupation enterprise" allows the state of Israel and commercial firms to profit from Palestinian natural resources and tourist potential. A 2013 report published by the World Bank analysed the impact that the limited access to Area C lands and resources had on the Palestinian economy. While settlements represent a single axis of control, it is the largest with 68% of the Area C lands reserved for the settlements. The report goes on to calculate that access to the lands and resources of Area C, including the territory in and around settlements, would increase the Palestinian GDP by some $3.5 billion (or 35%) per year.

The Israeli Supreme Court has ruled that Israeli companies are entitled to exploit the West Bank's natural resources for economic gain, and that international law must be "adapted" to the "reality on the ground" of long-term occupation.

Palestinian labour 
Due to the availability of jobs offering twice the prevailing salary of the West Bank, as well as high unemployment, tens of thousands of Palestinians work in Israeli settlements. According to the Manufacturers Association of Israel, some 22,000 Palestinians were employed in construction, agriculture, manufacturing and service industries. An Al-Quds University study in 2011 found that 82% of Palestinian workers said they would prefer to not work in Israeli settlements if they had alternative employment in the West Bank.

Palestinians have been highly involved in the construction of settlements in the West Bank. In 2013, the Palestinian Central Bureau of Statistics released their survey showing that the number of Palestinian workers who are employed by the Jewish settlements increased from 16,000 to 20,000 in the first quarter. The survey also found that Palestinians who work in Israel and the settlements are paid more than twice their salary compared to what they receive from Palestinian employers.

In 2008, Kav LaOved charged that Palestinians who work in Israeli settlements are not granted basic protections of Israeli labor law. Instead, they are employed under Jordanian labor law, which does not require minimum wage, payment for overtime and other social rights. In 2007, the Supreme Court of Israel ruled that Israeli labor law does apply to Palestinians working in West Bank settlements and applying different rules in the same work place constituted discrimination. The ruling allowed Palestinian workers to file lawsuits in Israeli courts. In 2008, the average sum claimed by such lawsuits stood at 100,000 shekels.

According to Palestinian Center for Policy and Survey Research, 63% of Palestinians opposed PA plans to prosecute Palestinians who work in the settlements. However, 72% of Palestinians support a boycott of the products they sell. Although the Palestinian Authority has criminalized working in the settlements, the director-general at the Palestinian Ministry of Labor, Samer Salameh, described the situation in February 2014 as being "caught between two fires". He said "We strongly discourage work in the settlements, since the entire enterprise is illegal and illegitimate...but given the high unemployment rate and the lack of alternatives, we do not enforce the law that criminalizes work in the settlements."

Violence

Israeli settler violence 

Gush Emunim Underground was a militant organization that operated in 1979–1984. The organization planned attacks on Palestinian officials and the Dome of the Rock. In 1994, Baruch Goldstein of Hebron, a member of Kach carried out the Cave of the Patriarchs massacre, killing 29 Muslim worshipers and injuring 125. The attack was widely condemned by the Israeli government and Jewish community. The Palestinian leadership has accused Israel of "encouraging and enabling" settler violence in a bid to provoke Palestinian riots and violence in retaliation. Violence perpetrated by Israeli settlers against Palestinians constitutes terrorism according to the U.S. Department of State, and former IDF Head of Central Command Avi Mizrahi stated that such violence constitutes "terror."

In mid-2008, a UN report recorded 222 acts of Israeli settler violence against Palestinians and IDF troops compared with 291 in 2007. This trend reportedly increased in 2009. Maj-Gen Shamni said that the number had risen from a few dozen individuals to hundreds, and called it "a very grave phenomenon." In 2008–2009, the defense establishment adopted a harder line against the extremists. This group responded with a tactic dubbed "price tagging", vandalizing Palestinian property whenever police or soldiers were sent in to dismantle outposts. From January through to September 2013, 276 attacks by settlers against Palestinians were recorded.

Leading religious figures in the West Bank have harshly criticized these tactics. Rabbi Menachem Froman of Tekoa said that "Targeting Palestinians and their property is a shocking thing, ... It's an act of hurting humanity. ... This builds a wall of fire between Jews and Arabs." The Yesha Council and Hanan Porat also condemned such actions. Other rabbis have been accused of inciting violence against non-Jews. In response to settler violence, the Israeli government said that it would increase law enforcement and cut off aid to illegal outposts. Some settlers are thought to lash out at Palestinians because they are "easy victims." The United Nations accused Israel of failing to intervene and arrest settlers suspected of violence. In 2008, Haaretz wrote that "Israeli society has become accustomed to seeing lawbreaking settlers receive special treatment and no other group could similarly attack Israeli law enforcement agencies without being severely punished."

In September 2011, settlers vandalized a mosque and an army base. They slashed tires and cut cables of 12 army vehicles and sprayed graffiti. In November 2011, the United Nations Office for Coordination of Human Affairs (OCHA) in the Palestinian territories published a report on settler violence that showed a significant rise compared to 2009 and 2010. The report covered physical violence and property damage such as uprooted olive trees, damaged tractors and slaughtered sheep. The report states that 90% of complaints filed by Palestinians have been closed without charge.

According to EU reports, Israel has created an "atmosphere of impunity" for Jewish attackers, which is seen as tantamount to tacit approval by the state. In the West Bank, Jews and Palestinians live under two different legal regimes and it is difficult for Palestinians to lodge complaints, which must be filed in Hebrew in Israeli settlements.

The 27 ministers of foreign affairs of the European Union published a report in May 2012 strongly denouncing policies of the State of Israel in the West Bank and denouncing "continuous settler violence and deliberate provocations against Palestinian civilians." The report by all EU ministers called "on the government of Israel to bring the perpetrators to justice and to comply with its obligations under international law."

In July 2014, a day after the burial of three murdered Israeli teens, Khdeir, a 16-year-old Palestinian, was forced into a car by 3 Israeli settlers on an East Jerusalem street. His family immediately reported the fact to Israeli Police who located his charred body a few hours later at Givat Shaul in the Jerusalem Forest. Preliminary results from the autopsy suggested that he was beaten and burnt while still alive. The murder suspects explained the attack as a response to the June abduction and murder of three Israeli teens. The murders contributed to a breakout of hostilities in the 2014 Israel–Gaza conflict.
In July 2015, a similar incident occurred where Israeli settlers made an arson attack on two Palestinian houses, one of which was empty; however, the other was occupied, resulting in the burning to death of a Palestinian infant; the four other members of his family were evacuated to the hospital suffering serious injuries. These two incidents received condemnation from the United States, European Union and the IDF. The European Union criticized Israel for "failing to protect the Palestinian population".

Olive trees 
While the economy of the Palestinian territories has shown signs of growth, the International Committee of the Red Cross reported that Palestinian olive farming has suffered. According to the ICRC, 10,000 olive trees were cut down or burned by settlers in 2007–2010. Foreign ministry spokesman Yigal Palmor said the report ignored official PA data showing that the economic situation of Palestinians had improved substantially, citing Mahmoud Abbas's comment to The Washington Post in May 2009, where he said "in the West Bank, we have a good reality, the people are living a normal life."

Haaretz blamed the violence during the olive harvest on a handful of extremists. In 2010, trees belonging to both Jews and Arabs were cut down, poisoned or torched. In the first two weeks of the harvest, 500 trees owned by Palestinians and 100 trees owned by Jews had been vandalized. In October 2013, 100 trees were cut down.

Violent attacks on olive trees seem to be facilitated by the apparently systematic refusal of the Israeli authorities to allow Palestinians to visit their own groves, sometimes for years, especially in cases where the groves are deemed to be too close to settlements.

Palestinian violence against settlers 
Israeli civilians living in settlements have been targeted by violence from armed Palestinian groups. These groups, according to Human Rights Watch, assert that settlers are "legitimate targets" that have "forfeited their civilian status by residing in settlements that are illegal under international humanitarian law." Both Human Rights Watch and B'tselem rejected this argument on the basis that the legal status of the settlements has no effect on the civilian status of their residents. Human Rights Watch said the "prohibition against intentional attacks against civilians is absolute." B'tselem said "The settlers constitute a distinctly civilian population, which is entitled to all the protections granted civilians by international law. The Israeli security forces' use of land in the settlements or the membership of some settlers in the Israeli security forces does not affect the status of the other residents living among them, and certainly does not make them proper targets of attack."

Fatal attacks on settlers have included firing of rockets and mortars and drive-by shootings, also targeting infants and children. Violent incidents include the murder of Shalhevet Pass, a ten-month-old baby shot by a Palestinian sniper in Hebron, and the murder of two teenagers by unknown perpetrators on 8 May 2001, whose bodies were hidden in a cave near Tekoa, a crime that Israeli authorities suggest may have been committed by Palestinian terrorists. In the Bat Ayin axe attack, children in Bat Ayin were attacked by a Palestinian wielding an axe and a knife. A 13-year-old boy was killed and another was seriously wounded. Rabbi Meir Hai, a father of seven, was killed in a drive-by shooting. In August 2011, five members of one family were killed in their beds. The victims were the father Ehud (Udi) Fogel, the mother Ruth Fogel, and three of their six children—Yoav, 11, Elad, 4, and Hadas, the youngest, a three-month-old infant. According to David Ha'ivri, and as reported by multiple sources, the infant was decapitated.

Pro-Palestinian activist violence 

Pro-Palestinian activists who hold regular protests near the settlements have been accused of stone-throwing, physical assault and provocation. In 2008, Avshalom Peled, head of the Israel Police's Hebron district, called "left-wing" activity in the city dangerous and provocative, and accused activists of antagonizing the settlers in the hope of getting a reaction.

Environmental issues 
Municipal Environmental Associations of Judea and Samaria, an environmental awareness group, was established by the settlers to address sewage treatment problems and cooperate with the Palestinian Authority on environmental issues. According to a 2004 report by Friends of the Earth Middle East, settlers account for 10% of the population in the West Bank but produce 25% of the sewage output. Beit Duqqu and Qalqilyah have accused settlers of polluting their farmland and villagers claim children have become ill after swimming in a local stream. Legal action was taken against 14 settlements by the Israeli Ministry of the Environment. The Palestinian Authority has also been criticized by environmentalists for not doing more to prevent water pollution. Settlers and Palestinians share the mountain aquifer as a water source, and both generate sewage and industrial effluents that endanger the aquifer. Friends of the Earth Middle East claimed that sewage treatment was inadequate in both sectors. Sewage from Palestinian sources was estimated at 46 million cubic meters a year, and sources from settler sources at 15 million cubic meters a year. A 2004 study found that sewage was not sufficiently treated in many settlements, while sewage from Palestinian villages and cities flowed into unlined cesspits, streams and the open environment with no treatment at all.

In a 2007 study, the Israel Nature and Parks Authority and Israeli Ministry of Environmental Protection, found that Palestinian towns and cities produced 56 million cubic meters of sewage per year, 94 percent discharged without adequate treatment, while Israeli sources produced 17.5 million cubic meters per year, 31.5 percent without adequate treatment.

According to Palestinian environmentalists, the settlers operate industrial and manufacturing plants that can create pollution as many do not conform to Israeli standards. In 2005, an old quarry between Kedumim and Nablus was slated for conversion into an industrial waste dump. Pollution experts warned that the dump would threaten Palestinian water sources.

Impact on Palestinian demographics 

The Consortium for Applied Research on International Migration (CARIM) has reported in their 2011 migration profile for Palestine that the reasons for individuals to leave the country are similar to those of other countries in the region and they attribute less importance to the specific political situation of the occupied Palestinian territory. Human Rights Watch in 2010 reported that Israeli settlement policies have had the effect of "forcing residents to leave their communities".

In 2008, Condoleezza Rice suggested sending Palestinian refugees to South America, which might reduce pressure on Israel to withdraw from the settlements. Sushil P. Seth speculates that Israelis seem to feel that increasing settlements will force many Palestinians to flee to other countries and that the remainder will be forced to live under Israeli terms. Speaking anonymously with regard to Israeli policies in the South Hebron Hills, a UN expert said that the Israeli crackdown on alternative energy infrastructures like solar panels is part of a deliberate strategy in Area C.
"From December 2010 to April 2011, we saw a systematic targeting of the water infrastructure in Hebron, Bethlehem and the Jordan valley. Now, in the last couple of months, they are targeting electricity. Two villages in the area have had their electrical poles demolished. There is this systematic effort by the civil administration targeting all Palestinian infrastructure in Hebron. They are hoping that by making it miserable enough, they [the Palestinians] will pick up and leave."
Approximately 1,500 people in 16 communities are dependent on energy produced by these installations duct business are threatened with work stoppage orders from the Israeli administration on their installation of alternative power infrastructure, and demolition orders expected to follow will darken the homes of 500 people.

Educational institutions 

Ariel University, formerly the College of Judea and Samaria, is the major Israeli institution of higher education in the West Bank. With close to 13,000 students, it is Israel's largest public college. The college was accredited in 1994 and awards bachelor's degrees in arts, sciences, technology, architecture and physical therapy. On 17 July 2012, the Council for Higher Education in Judea and Samaria voted to grant the institution full university status.

Teacher training colleges include Herzog College in Alon Shvut and Orot Israel College in Elkana. Ohalo College is located in Katzrin, in the Golan Heights. Curricula at these institutions are overseen by the Council for Higher Education in Judea and Samaria (CHE-JS).

In March 2012, The Shomron Regional Council was awarded the Israeli Ministry of Education's first prize National Education Award in recognizing its excellence in investing substantial resources in the educational system. The Shomron Regional Council achieved the highest marks in all parameters (9.28 / 10). Gershon Mesika, the head of the regional council, declared that the award was a certificate of honour of its educators and the settlement youth who proved their quality and excellence.

Strategic significance 

In 1983 an Israeli government plan entitled "Master Plan and Development Plan for Settlement in Samaria and Judea" envisaged placing a "maximally large Jewish population" in priority areas to accomplish incorporation of the West Bank in the Israeli "national system". According to Ariel Sharon, strategic settlement locations would work to preclude the formation of a Palestinian state.

Palestinians argue that the policy of settlements constitutes an effort to preempt or sabotage a peace treaty that includes Palestinian sovereignty, and claim that the presence of settlements harm the ability to have a viable and contiguous state. This was also the view of the Israeli Vice Prime Minister Haim Ramon in 2008, saying "the pressure to enlarge Ofra and other settlements does not stem from a housing shortage, but rather is an attempt to undermine any chance of reaching an agreement with the Palestinians ..."

The Israel Foreign Ministry asserts that some settlements are legitimate, as they took shape when there was no operative diplomatic arrangement, and thus they did not violate any agreement. Based on this, they assert that:

 Prior to the signing of the Egypt–Israel peace treaty, the eruption of the First Intifada, down to the signing of the Israel–Jordan peace treaty in 1994, Israeli governments on the left and right argued that the settlements were of strategic and tactical importance. The location of the settlements was primarily chosen based on the threat of an attack by the bordering hostile countries of Jordan, Syria, and Egypt and possible routes of advance into Israeli population areas. These settlements were seen as contributing to the security of Israel at a time when peace treaties had not been signed.

Dismantling of settlements 

An early evacuation took place in 1982 as part of the Egypt–Israel peace treaty, when Israel was required to evacuate its settlers from the 18 Sinai settlements. Arab parties to the conflict had demanded the dismantlement of the settlements as a condition for peace with Israel. The evacuation was carried out with force in some instances, for example in Yamit. The settlements were demolished, as it was feared that settlers might try to return to their homes after the evacuation.

Israel's unilateral disengagement plan took place in 2005. It involved the evacuation of settlements in the Gaza Strip and part of the West Bank, including all 21 settlements in Gaza and four in the West Bank, while retaining control over Gaza's borders, coastline, and airspace. Most of these settlements had existed since the early 1980s, some were over 30 years old; the total population involved was more than 10,000. There was significant opposition to the plan among parts of the Israeli public, and especially those living in the territories. George W. Bush said that a permanent peace deal would have to reflect "demographic realities" in the West Bank regarding Israel's settlements.

Within the former settlements, almost all buildings were demolished by Israel, with the exception of certain government and religious structures, which were completely emptied. Under an international arrangement, productive greenhouses were left to assist the Palestinian economy but about 30% of these were destroyed within hours by Palestinian looters. Following the withdrawal, many of the former synagogues were torched and destroyed by Palestinians.

Some believe that settlements need not necessarily be dismantled and evacuated, even if Israel withdraws from the territory where they stand, as they can remain under Palestinian rule. These ideas have been expressed both by left-wing Israelis, and by Palestinians who advocate the two-state solution, and by extreme Israeli right-wingers and settlers who object to any dismantling and claim links to the land that are stronger than the political boundaries of the state of Israel.

The Israeli government has often threatened to dismantle outposts. Some have actually been dismantled, occasionally with use of force; this led to settler violence.

Palestinian statehood bid of 2011 
American refusal to declare the settlements illegal was said to be the determining factor in the 2011 attempt to declare Palestinian statehood at the United Nations, the so-called Palestine 194 initiative.

Israel announced additional settlements in response to the Palestinian diplomatic initiative and Germany responded by moving to stop deliveries to Israel of submarines capable of carrying nuclear weapons.

Finally in 2012, several European states switched to either abstain or vote for statehood in response to continued settlement construction. Israel approved further settlements in response to the vote, which brought further worldwide condemnation.

Impact on peace process 

The settlements have been a source of tension between Israel and the U.S. Jimmy Carter regarded the settlements as illegal and tactically unwise. Ronald Reagan stated that they were legal but an obstacle to negotiations. In 1991, the U.S. delayed a subsidized loan to pressure Israel on the subject of settlement-building in the Jerusalem-Bethlehem corridor. In 2005, U.S. declared support for "the retention by Israel of major Israeli population centers as an outcome of negotiations," reflecting the statement by George W. Bush that a permanent peace treaty would have to reflect "demographic realities" in the West Bank. In June 2009, Barack Obama said that the United States "does not accept the legitimacy of continued Israeli settlements."

Palestinians claim that Israel has undermined the Oslo accords and peace process by continuing to expand the settlements. Settlements in the Sinai Peninsula were evacuated and razed in the wake of the peace agreement with Egypt. The 27 ministers of foreign affairs of the European Union published a report in May 2012 strongly denouncing policies of the State of Israel in the West Bank and finding that Israeli settlements in the West Bank are illegal and "threaten to make a two-state solution impossible." In the framework of the Oslo I Accord of 1993 between the Israeli government and the Palestine Liberation Organization (PLO), a modus vivendi was reached whereby both parties agreed to postpone a final solution on the destination of the settlements to the permanent status negotiations (Article V.3). Israel claims that settlements thereby were not prohibited, since there is no explicit interim provision prohibiting continued settlement construction, the agreement does register an undertaking by both sides, namely that "Neither side shall initiate or take any step that will change the status of the West Bank and the Gaza Strip pending the outcome of the permanent status negotiations" (Article XXX1 (7)), which has been interpreted as, not forbidding settlements, but imposing severe restrictions on new settlement building after that date. Melanie Jacques argued in this context that even 'agreements between Israel and the Palestinians which would allow settlements in the OPT, or simply tolerate them pending a settlement of the conflict, violate the Fourth Geneva Convention.'

Final status proposals have called for retaining long-established communities along the Green Line and transferring the same amount of land in Israel to the Palestinian state. The Clinton administration proposed that Israel keep some settlements in the West Bank, especially those in large blocs near the pre-1967 borders of Israel, with the Palestinians receiving concessions of land in other parts of the country. Both Clinton and Tony Blair pointed out the need for territorial and diplomatic compromise based on the validity of some of the claims of both sides.

As Minister of Defense, Ehud Barak approved a plan requiring security commitments in exchange for withdrawal from the West Bank. Barak also expressed readiness to cede parts of East Jerusalem and put the holy sites in the city under a "special regime."

On 14 June 2009, Israeli Prime Minister Benjamin Netanyahu, as an answer to U.S. President Barack Obama's speech in Cairo, delivered a speech setting out his principles for a Palestinian-Israeli peace, among others, he alleged "... we have no intention of building new settlements or of expropriating additional land for existing settlements." In March 2010, the Netanyahu government announced plans for building 1,600 housing units in Ramat Shlomo across the Green Line in East Jerusalem during U.S. Vice President Joe Biden's visit to Israel causing a diplomatic row.

On 6 September 2010, Jordanian King Abdullah II and Syrian President Bashar al-Assad said that Israel would need to withdraw from all of the lands occupied in 1967 in order to achieve peace with the Palestinians.

Bradley Burston has said that a negotiated or unilateral withdraw from most of the settlements in the West Bank is gaining traction in Israel.

In November 2010, the United States offered to "fight against efforts to delegitimize Israel" and provide extra arms to Israel in exchange for a continuation of the settlement freeze and a final peace agreement, but failed to come to an agreement with the Israelis on the exact terms.

In December 2010, the United States criticised efforts by the Palestinian Authority to impose borders for the two states through the United Nations rather than through direct negotiations between the two sides. In February 2011, it vetoed a draft resolution to condemn all Jewish settlements established in the occupied Palestinian territory since 1967 as illegal. The resolution, which was supported by all other Security Council members and co-sponsored by nearly 120 nations, would have demanded that "Israel, as the occupying power, immediately and completely ceases all settlement activities in the occupied Palestinian territory, including East Jerusalem and that it fully respect its legal obligations in this regard." The U.S. representative said that while it agreed that the settlements were illegal, the resolution would harm chances for negotiations. Israel's deputy Foreign Minister, Daniel Ayalon, said that the "UN serves as a rubber stamp for the Arab countries and, as such, the General Assembly has an automatic majority," and that the vote "proved that the United States is the only country capable of advancing the peace process and the only righteous one speaking the truth: that direct talks between Israel and the Palestinians are required." Palestinian negotiators, however, have refused to resume direct talks until Israel ceases all settlement activity.

In November 2009, Israeli Prime Minister Netanyahu issued a 10-month settlement freeze in the West Bank in an attempt to restart negotiations with the Palestinians. The freeze did not apply to building in Jerusalem in areas across the green line, housing already under construction and existing construction described as "essential for normal life in the settlements" such as synagogues, schools, kindergartens and public buildings. The Palestinians refused to negotiate without a complete halt to construction. In the face of pressure from the United States and most world powers supporting the demand by the Palestinian Authority that Israel desist from settlement project in 2010, Israel's ambassador to the UN Meron Reuben said Israel would only stop settlement construction after a peace agreement is concluded, and expressed concern were Arab countries to press for UN recognition of a Palestinian state before such an accord. He cited Israel's dismantlement of settlements in both the Sinai which took place after a peace agreement, and its unilateral dismantlement of settlements in the Gaza Strip. He presumed that settlements would stop being built were Palestinians to establish a state in a given area.

Proposals for land swap 

The Clinton Parameters, a 2000 peace proposal by then U.S. President Bill Clinton, included a plan on which the Palestinian State was to include 94–96% of the West Bank, and around 80% of the settlers were to be under Israeli sovereignty, and in exchange for that, Israel will concede some territory (so called 'Territory Exchange' or 'Land Swap') within the Green Line (1967 borders). The swap would consist of 1–3% of Israeli territory, such that the final borders of the West Bank part of the Palestinian state would include 97% of the land of the original borders.

In 2010, Palestinian Authority President Mahmoud Abbas said that the Palestinians and Israel have agreed on the principle of a land swap. The issue of the ratio of land Israel would give to the Palestinians in exchange for keeping settlement blocs is an issue of dispute, with the Palestinians demanding that the ratio be 1:1, and Israel insisting that other factors be considered as well.

Under any peace deal with the Palestinians, Israel intends to keep the major settlement blocs close to its borders, which contain over 80% of the settlers. Prime Ministers Yitzhak Rabin, Ariel Sharon, and Benjamin Netanyahu have all stated Israel's intent to keep such blocs under any peace agreement. U.S. President George W. Bush acknowledged that such areas should be annexed to Israel in a 2004 letter to Prime Minister Sharon.

The European Union position is that any annexation of settlements should be done as part of mutually agreed land swaps, which would see the Palestinians controlling territory equivalent to the territory captured in 1967. The EU says that it will not recognise any changes to the 1967 borders without an agreement between the parties.

Israeli Foreign Minister Avigdor Lieberman has proposed a plan which would see settlement blocs annexed to Israel in exchange for heavily Arab areas inside Israel as part of a population exchange.

According to Mitchell G. Bard: "Ultimately, Israel may decide to unilaterally disengage from the West Bank and determine which settlements it will incorporate within the borders it delineates. Israel would prefer, however, to negotiate a peace treaty with the Palestinians that would specify which Jewish communities will remain intact within the mutually agreed border of Israel, and which will need to be evacuated. Israel will undoubtedly insist that some or all of the "consensus" blocs become part of Israel".

Proposal of dual citizenship 
A number of proposals for the granting of Palestinian citizenship or residential permits to Jewish settlers in return for the removal of Israeli military installations from the West Bank have been fielded by such individuals as Arafat, Ibrahim Sarsur and Ahmed Qurei. In contrast, Mahmoud Abbas said in July 2013 that "In a final resolution, we would not see the presence of a single Israeli—civilian or soldier—on our lands."

Israeli Minister Moshe Ya'alon said in April 2010 that "just as Arabs live in Israel, so, too, should Jews be able to live in Palestine." ... "If we are talking about coexistence and peace, why the [Palestinian] insistence that the territory they receive be ethnically cleansed of Jews?".

The idea has been expressed by both advocates of the two-state solution and supporters of the settlers and conservative or fundamentalist currents in Israeli Judaism that, while objecting to any withdrawal, claim stronger links to the land than to the State of Israel.

Settlement expansion

Pre Resolution 2334
On 19 June 2011, Haaretz reported that the Israeli cabinet voted to revoke Defense Minister Ehud Barak's authority to veto new settlement construction in the West Bank, by transferring this authority from the Agriculture Ministry, headed by Barak ally Orit Noked, to the Prime Minister's office.

In 2009, newly elected Prime Minister Benjamin Netanyahu said: "I have no intention of building new settlements in the West Bank... But like all the governments there have been until now, I will have to meet the needs of natural growth in the population. I will not be able to choke the settlements." On 15 October 2009, he said the settlement row with the United States had been resolved.

In April 2012, four illegal outposts were retroactively legalized by the Israeli government. In June 2012, the Netanyahu government announced a plan to build 851 homes in five settlements: 300 units in Beit El and 551 units in other settlements.

Amid peace negotiations that showed little signs of progress, Israel issued on 3 November 2013, tenders for 1,700 new homes for Jewish settlers. The plots were offered in nine settlements in areas Israel says it intends to keep in any peace deal with the Palestinians. On 12 November, Peace Now revealed that the Construction and Housing Ministry had issued tenders for 24,000 more settler homes in the West Bank, including 4,000 in East Jerusalem. 2,500 units were planned in Ma'aleh Adumim, some 9,000 in the Gush Etzion Region, and circa 12,000 in the Binyamin Region, including 1,200 homes in the E1 area in addition to 3,000 homes in previously frozen E1 projects. Circa 15,000 homes of the 24,000 plan would be east of the West Bank Barrier and create the first new settlement blocs for two decades, and the first blocs ever outside the Barrier, far inside the West Bank.

As stated before, the Israeli government (as of 2015) has a program of residential subsidies in which Israeli settlers receive about double that given to Israelis in Tel Aviv and Jerusalem. As well, settlers in isolated areas receive three times the Israeli national average. From the beginning of 2009 to the end of 2013, the Israeli settlement population as a whole increased by a rate of over 4% per year. A New York Times article in 2015 stated that said building had been "at the heart of mounting European criticism of Israel."

Resolution 2334 and quarterly reports
United Nations Security Council Resolution 2334 "Requests the Secretary-General to report to the Council every three months on the implementation of the provisions of the present resolution;"
In the first of these reports, delivered verbally at a security council meeting on 24 March 2017, United Nations Special Coordinator for the Middle East Peace Process, Nickolay Mladenov, noted that Resolution 2334 called on Israel to take steps to cease all settlement activity in the Occupied Palestinian Territory, that "no such steps have been taken during the reporting period" and that instead, there had been a marked increase in statements, announcements and decisions related to construction and expansion.

Regularization and outpost method

The 2017 Settlement Regularization in "Judea and Samaria" Law permits backdated legalization of outposts constructed on private Palestinian land. Following a petition challenging its legality, on June 9, 2020, Israel's Supreme Court struck down the law that had retroactively legalized about 4,000 settler homes built on privately owned Palestinian land. The Israeli Attorney General has stated that existing laws already allow legalization of Israeli constructions on private Palestinian land in the West Bank. The Israeli Attorney General, Avichai Mandelblit, has updated the High Court on his official approval of the use of a legal tactic permitting the de facto legalization of roughly 2,000 illegally built Israeli homes throughout the West Bank. The legal mechanism is known as "market regulation" and relies on the notion that wildcat Israeli homes built on private Palestinian land were done so in good faith.

In a report of 22 July 2019, PeaceNow notes that after a gap of 6 years when there were no new outposts, establishment of new outposts recommenced in 2012, with 32 of the current 126 outposts set up to date. 2 outposts were subject to eviction, 15 were legalized and at least 35 are in process of legalization.

Updates and related matters
The Israeli government announced in 2019 that it has made monetary grants available for the construction of hotels in Area C of the West Bank.

According to Peace Now, approvals for building in Israeli settlements in East Jerusalem expanded by 60% between 2017, when Donald Trump became US president, and 2019.

On 9 July 2021, Michael Lynk, U.N. special rapporteur on human rights in the occupied Palestinian territory, addressing a session of the UN Human Rights Council in Geneva, said "I conclude that the Israeli settlements do amount to a war crime," and  "I submit to you that this finding compels the international community...to make it clear to Israel that its illegal occupation, and its defiance of international law and international opinion, can and will no longer be cost-free." Israel, which does not recognize Lynk's mandate, boycotted the session.

A new Israeli government, formed on 13 June 2021, declared a "status quo" in the settlements policy. According to Peace Now, as of 28 October this has not been the case. On October 24, 2021, tenders were published for 1,355 housing units plus another 83 in Givat HaMatos and on 27 October 2021, approval was given for 3,000 housing units including in settlements deep inside the West Bank. These developments were condemned by the U.S. as well as by the United Kingdom, Russia and 12 European countries. while UN experts, Michael Lynk, Special Rapporteur on the situation of human rights in the Palestinian Territory occupied since 1967 and Mr. Balakrishnan Rajagopal (United States of America), UN Special Rapporteur on adequate housing said that settlement expansion should be treated as a "presumptive war crime".

See also 

 Israeli settlement timeline
 Jewish land purchase in Palestine
 List of Israeli settlements
 Neo-Zionism
 Palestinian Land Law
 Population statistics for Israeli West Bank settlements
 Proposed Israeli annexation of the West Bank
 State of Judea
 Development town
 Unrecognized Bedouin villages in Israel
 Kibbutz

Notes

References

Further reading 
 Israeli Settlements interactive map and Israeli land use from The Guardian
 Israeli Settlements. Bloomberg News
 Israeli settlements: Where, when, and why they're built, Ilene R. Prusher, The Christian Science Monitor, 15 September 2009
 Text of the Fourth 1949 Geneva Convention from icrc.org
 The legal status of Israeli settlements under IHL (International Humanitarian Law), Reuters ReliefWeb, 31 January 2004
 The Humanitarian Impact on Palestinians of Israeli Settlements and Other Infrastructure in the West Bank from UN OCHA, Palestinian territories
 Israeli Communities in Yesha & Jordan Valley
 The Illegal Settlements—slideshow by The First Post
 

Viewpoints and commentary
 Monitoring Israeli Colonization Activities in the Palestinian Territory, The Applied Research Institute Jerusalem
 Land Expropriation and Settlements from B'tselem
 Israel and The Palestinian Territories, The Carter Center
 Israeli Confiscation and Settlement on Palestinian Land from If Americans Knew
 Settlements and Settlements and U.S. Policy, Americans for Peace Now
 Bregman, Ahron, Elusive Peace: How the Holy Land Defeated America
 "The Wye River Memorandum and Israeli Settlements", Geoffrey Aronson, The Jerusalem Fund, 4 August 1999
 For Israel, Land or Peace Jimmy Carter, The Carter Center, 26 November 2000
 Backgrounder: Jewish settlements and the Media from the Committee for Accuracy in Middle East Reporting in America, 5 October 2001
 From "occupied territories" to "disputed territories", Dore Gold, Jerusalem Center for Public Affairs, 16 January 2002
 Ottoman Land Registration Law as a Contributing Factor in the Israeli-Arab Conflict by Rabbi Jon-Jay Tilsen, 2003
 Diplomatic and Legal Aspects of the Settlement Issue from the Jerusalem Center for Public Affairs, 19 January 2003
 Occupation and Settlement: The Myth and Reality, David Meir-Levi, Think-Israel.org, 24 June 2005
 "At Israeli Outpost, Showdown Looms for Settlers, Government" Gershom Gorenberg, Jewish Daily Forward, 27 January 2006
 Settlements 'violate Israeli law', BBC News, 21 November 2006
 Backgrounder: The debate about settlements from the Committee for Accuracy in Middle East Reporting in America, 13 June 2007
 "Israel's Settlers Are Here to Stay" op-ed by Dani Dayan in The New York Times 25 July 2012

External links

 2019 amnesty 2019 Think Twice: Can companies do business with Israeli settlements in the Occupied Palestinian Territories while respecting human rights?
 UNSC 2334 quarterly reports

 
1967 establishments in Israel
Populated places established in 1967
Israeli-occupied territories